Girish and the Chronicles also known as GATC, is an Indian rock band from Gangtok, Sikkim, formed in 2009, by Vocalist Girish Pradhan. The line-up consists of Girish Pradhan on the Vocals, Yogesh Pradhan on the Bass, Suraz Sun on the Lead Guitars and Nagen Mongrati on the Drums. They have been based in Bengaluru, Karnataka, since 2013. The band has 3 Studio albums to their name.

History 

Early releases:

The band released their first ever promotional demo single, Angel, in 2009, in CD format. It was re-released in January 2010 with The North Eastern Times Magazine's, The Great Eastern Rock Vol. 2, CD compilation. It was followed by a series of demos and single releases between 2011 and 2013, with songs like The Golden Crown, Loaded, A New Beginning, Yesteryears, mostly on their YouTube Channel.

Post 2013:

The band released their debut album Back On Earth in 2014, with Universal Music Group, India. They released their second album, Rock The Highway, with a Denmark based record label, Lions Pride Music, in April 2020. The band release their third studio album, titled, Hail To The Heroes, via Frontiers Records on 11 February 2022.

Back On Earth (Album, 2014)

The plans to release a debut album had been a long overdue for the band, since their jamming days in 2006. They had already independently released several singles like Angel, The Golden Crown, Loaded, A new beginning, Smile Little Child and Yesteryears, on their YouTube channel (from 2009 to 2012). The band was still trying to figure out the best way to release an album, as it was a point in time, when streaming music on apps, simply didn't exist for majority of the masses, specially in North East India. Spotify hadn't launched in India and iTunes was something that not everyone had access to. The culture of buying CDs had completely died off. Moreover, the band was more focused on touring and were themselves not aware of a trend in music steaming. YouTube was the only reliable platform for them to release songs on. These factors contributed to the band not taking much interest in releasing an album, as they felt it would just be a waste. All the songs were written in different timelines, but started taking the shape of an album.

By 2012, the band was ready with a set of 7-8 songs, which included songs like Ride To Hell, I Wanna Get That Lovin' again and the singles which they had previously released. This was a year when the band had moved to Hong Kong for a year as a house band in the clubs out there.  The job oriented lifestyle further stopped the band from progressing, in terms of releasing an album. The band returned to India in early 2013 and in a span of 3 months, finally compiled an album. Although still unsure of the method of release, they kept it on hold. The band finally relocated to the city of Bangalore at around April 2013, where the band visited the studios and re-recorded the vocals on some of the songs.

In the middle of the year, the band successfully got in touch with Universal Music India and got a deal to release an album, with some help from their management at the time. They further wrote a few newer songs such as End of Civilization and Born With a Big Attitude. They also finished recording some older demos such as Revolving Barrel. The entire rhythm guitar section was re-recorded with Les Pauls, replacing the earlier Fender Stratocaster + Telecaster versions. The album was named Back On Earth and was finally released internationally via Universal Music India, with the video for Angel being featured on VH1 along with a six city Hard Rock Cafe tour.

The album did not make a large impact and it failed to reach the intended audience, according to the band. Later on, the entire album was shot with Music Mojo (Kappa TV) and was released on their YouTube channel, which helped the songs reach out to a wider audience. At around 2019, the band got in touch with the label and decided to take down the album from all the streaming platforms, as they felt that a reissue was much needed in the future. They have not announced anything to date.

Endless Road (single, 2016)

The band released their single, "Endless Road", in 2016, in collaboration with the clothing company, Roadster Life Company. Meant originally as an anthem for the company in their campaign, it gave the band a wide exposure to the Indian audience, with over 2 Million views on the video. The band also took an Indian Folk approach on the songwriting. It was shot at the Rann of Kutch, a salt desert in the state of Gujarat.

Rock the Highway (Single, 2018)

The band released a video for their new single in December 2018. It was first featured on the Canadian web magazine, Sleaze Roxx. The band was approached by a Denmark based record label, Lion's Pride for a new album.

Rock the Highway (Album, 2020)

The idea of releasing a second GATC album had been building up for many years, since their last album release (Back on Earth), in 2014. It became concrete with the band releasing a new single video, named Rock The Highway, on New Year's Eve of 2018. It was first featured on the Canadian online melodic rock magazine, Sleaze Roxx. Soon after, the band was approached by a Denmark-based Record Label, Lions Pride Music, for an album deal. It was perfect timing, as the band had already written many demos and were ready to start recording a new album. The album release date was set to 27 April 2020 and it was to be named, Rock The Highway. 

After a year, the band released a video for, Rock 'n' Roll is Here To Stay, officially announcing their second studio album, Rock The Highway, on 29 March 2020.  It was filmed by Cary Hubbs, a Prague based film maker, originally from Los Angeles, during his visit to Bengaluru, India. The song was well received by fans and critics alike and reached a wide Hard Rock/Metal audience, all over the world, like never seen before by the band. The US based online magazine, MetalSucks, was one of the biggest factors in introducing the band to a newer audience, who featured the song upon its release. Axl Rosenberg of MetalSucks wrote:  "It sounds exactly like something Riki Rachtman woulda played on Headbanger's Ball in the late '80s or early '90s, and I mean that in the best possible way". The song received praises from prominent names in the world of Metal, such as Chris Adler and Thomas Gabriel. Although, Girish Pradhan had also already joined Firstborne, a side project lead by Chris Adler along with James LoMenzo and Myrone by then.

Rock the Highway, the album, was finally released on 27 April 2020, with the video for Identity Crisis. The Canadian online magazine, Sleaze Roxx was one of the first to feature the song., along with Rolling Stones India.

Rolling Stones India wrote: "Standing at about one hour and four minutes, Bengaluru-based, Gangtok bred act Girish and the Chronicles' new album Rock the Highway is pretty much pure mayhem for any fan of Eighties rock and metal. Across 13 songs that don't bow down to any gimmicks and offer everything from glam metal to rock 'n roll, frontman Girish Pradhan is at his soaring, pitch-perfect best". 

MetalSucks, listed Rock The Highway, third position in, 'Vince Neilstein's Top 15 Metal Albums of 2020'.

Many other magazines listed the album as one of the top rated album released that year 

Although the band was greatly affected by the pandemic, this album was to a certain extent, a turning point in their career, getting recognition around the world. They also finally started talks of a third album with Frontiers Records soon after.

Hail to the Heroes (Album 2022)

The band released their third studio album, Hail to the Heroes, on 11 February 2022, via Frontiers Records.

In early 2021, the band signed a multi-album deal with Frontiers Records. With that, GATC became the first ever Indian band to get signed by the label.

The band released their first single, "Lovers' Train", off their upcoming album, with Frontiers Records on 11 November 2021. It was released along with an artwork as a single. The band were in Switzerland, for UrRock Festival during its release and also performed this song live out there.

Soon after, GATC released a music video for "Primeval Desire", on 2 December 2021, also announcing their 3rd studio album, "Hail To The Heroes", to be released on 11 February 2022, via Frontiers Records. Axl Rosenburg of MetalSucks wrote: Get ready to party like it's 1989: Girish and the Chronicles, who are arguably* the best hair metal band out there right now, have released a new song called "Primeval Desire." 

Their third release and their second music Video, also the title track to the album, "Hail to The Heroes", was released on 14 January 2022. It was featured on Metal Injection which wrote, "The single pays tribute to the rock and metal heroes of the '80s that have sadly left this world while also offering a positive message of unity. As for the music, it does an excellent job of memorializing the legends that have gone before us all". The video for both the songs were shot by Prabal Deep Das, at different locations in Goa.

On 11 February 2022, the band released the video for, Love's Damnation, also announcing the album.

Major Performances

GATC have opened for/shared stage with/supported, Hoobastank (2013), Poets of The Fall (St. John's Medical College, Bangalore, 2016), Destruction (Bangalore Open Air, 2014), TesseracT (IISc Bangalore, 2019) over the years and also backed Chris Adler in his The Chris Adler Experience tour, in India, in 2019, Nazareth, (2021, UrRock Fest, Sarnen, Switzerland) 

Performance at UrRock Festival, Switzerland.

In 13 and 14 November 2021, the band performed at Ur Rock Music Festival, as the first headliners in Sarnen, Switzerland, sharing stage with Nazareth. The festival included other notable names such as Firewind, Orden Ogan, Coroner, Savage Messiah, Rage and more. It was for the first time, a band from Sikkim, had become a part of an international Hard Rock/Metal festival, in the European continent. GATC was to perform on 14 November, however they also performed on the 13th, as the first headliner, due to Coroner cancelling their show that night. The band was well received and both the shows were successful, with them getting some good media coverage and new fans in Switzerland.

Discography Summary:

Back On Earth (Album, 2014)

Endless Road (Single, 2016)

Rock The Highway (Single, 2019)

Rock The Highway (Album, 2020)

Lovers' Train (Single, Nov 2021)

Primeval Desire (Music Video, Dec 2021)

Hail To The Heroes (Music Video, Jan 2022)

Love's Damnation (Music Video, Feb 2022)

Hail to the Heroes (Album, Feb 2022)

Members 

 Girish Pradhan – Vocals/Guitars
 Suraz Sun – Lead guitars
 Yogesh Pradhan – Bass guitars/Chief studio producer/Keyboards(Studio)
 Nagen Mongranti – Drums

Discography 

Back on Earth (2014)
Rock the Highway (2020)
Hail to the Heroes (2022)

See also 

Kryptos (band)
Bhayanak Maut
Nicotine (band)
Inner Sanctum (band)
Scribe (band)
Rusty Moe
Demonic Resurrection

References

External links 
 

Indian rock music groups
People from Gangtok
Musical groups established in 2009
Musical quartets
Artists from Sikkim